Robert Góralczyk may refer to:

 Robert Góralczyk (football manager) (born 1974), Polish football manager
 Robert Góralczyk (ice hockey) (1943–1984), Polish ice hockey player